Caciomorpha is a genus of beetles in the family Cerambycidae, containing the following species:

 Caciomorpha batesi Pascoe, 1858
 Caciomorpha buquetii Guérin-Méneville, 1844
 Caciomorpha genalis Aurivillius, 1908
 Caciomorpha palliata (White, 1855)
 Caciomorpha plagiata Bates, 1875
 Caciomorpha robusta Galileo & Martins, 1998
 Caciomorpha susua (Martins & Galileo, 1996)

References

Anisocerini